Olga Sazhina (born 19 February 1986) is a retired Russian female volleyball player, who played as a wing spiker.

She was part of the Russia women's national volleyball team at the 2004 FIVB World Grand Prix.

References

External links 
 FIVB profile
 http://www.russiavolley.com/tag/olga-sazhina/
 CEV profile

1986 births
Living people
Russian women's volleyball players
Place of birth missing (living people)